The Frank Uehling Barn, in rural Dodge County, Nebraska near Uehling, Nebraska, is a round barn which was built in 1918.  It was listed on the National Register of Historic Places in 1985.

References

Round barns in Nebraska
National Register of Historic Places in Dodge County, Nebraska
Buildings and structures completed in 1918